William Halliday may refer to:

 William Halliday (politician) (1828–1892), Australian politician
 William Reginald Halliday (1886–1966), English historian
 William P. Halliday (1827–1899), American steamboat captain, banker and businessman

See also
 William Haliday (1788–1812), Irish language scholar
 William Holliday (disambiguation)